Prof. Dr. Numan Kurtulmuş (born 23 March 1959) is a Turkish politician and academician, currently the deputy chairman of Justice and Development Party.

He served as Deputy Prime Minister of Turkey in the 62nd, 63rd, 64th and 65th AKP governments between 2014 and 2017 and Minister of Culture and Tourism between 2017 and 2018. Previously he served as the leader of Felicity Party between 2008 and 2010 and People's Voice Party between 2010 and 2012.

Personal life

Family 
Kurtulmuş was born in Ünye district of Ordu Province. He is of Georgian descent by his grandmother. His grandfather Numan Kurtulmuş who served as a major in the Turkish War of Independence on the Çanakkale, Erzurum, Batumi and Azerbaijan fronts and fought in the Balkans and the Battle of Sakarya then later has injured and retired as a veteran. He is also the author of Faith Commentary, known as the first Turkish religious guide which written by the Latin alphabet. His father is Dr. Ismail Niyazi Kurtulmuş. He currently resides in Fatih district of Istanbul with his family.

He married Sevgi Kurtulmuş in 1988. Children: Ayşe, İsmail and Emir. He speaks fluent English. A fan of Fenerbahçe FC.

Education and Academic career 
He studied at Istanbul Imam Hatip High School, bachelor in 1982 and master degree in 1984 at Istanbul University Faculty of Business Administration.

He had been United States of America to the postgraduate studies at Temple University School of Business & Management in 1988–1989.

He was also a visiting researcher at Cornell University New York State School of Industrial & Labor Relations between 1990 and 1993. He got a PhD title from Istanbul University in 1992. Became an associate professor in 1994 and promoted to professorship in 2004 at Istanbul University Faculty of Economics. He was the assistant of Sabahattin Zaim, who known as a 'the great professor'.

He taught politics, labor economics and human resources management at Istanbul University Faculty of Economics and economics and political communication at Istanbul Commerce University. He also participated as a speaker in symposiums and seminars.

Books 
He's authored two books Post-Industrial Transformation and The Japanese Human Resource Management.  Published master's degree and Phd thesis on Integration of Inventory Management by the Database Approach and The change of Industrial Relations for Terms of Model Human Type, also with many articles.

He authored a book Bringing Turkey to the Future on the confused current world with some proposals for a new future via multi-disciplines in 2020.

Political career 

He was kicked-off politic on Virtue Party in 1998. The party has been shut down by Constitutional Court and he joined Felicity Party. Elected as chairman at the party congress held in 2008 and has been here until 2010.  Leaded establishing the People's Voice Party (HAS Party) in 2010. Upon the proposal of Recep Tayyip Erdoğan, AKP and HAS Party united in 2012. Within the framework of this combination, HAS Party has been terminated itself and Kurtulmuş joined AKP with many people.

Virtue Party (1998–2001) 
In 1998, he began the political career with Necmettin Erbakan and served as the chairman in Istanbul and a Member of the Main Administrative Board. When ended Virtue Party, he joined the Felicity Party in 2001.

Felicity Party (2001–2010) 
He served as chairman in Istanbul and Deputy Chairman of Party until 2008 at Felicity Party. Recai Kutan who Chairman of Felicity Party announced on 17 October 2008 that Numan Kurtulmuş will be candidate in the party congress to be held in Ankara on 26 October 2008. The slogan was "Felicity Now!" And he was elected as a Chairman of Felicity Party by all valid 924 vote of the used 946 at 3rd Party Congress held in Ankara Atatürk Sports Hall.

In 2010, he had divergency with Necmettin Erbakan who was the leader of the Milli Görüş Movement. Numan Kurtulmuş was re-elected as Chairman of Party, participating as just one candidate of the two lists at the 4th Party Congress held in Ankara on 11 July 2010. Numan Kurtulmuş participated in the election of Main Administrative Board with the white list against Necmettin Erbakan's green list. And the winner white list meant to be kicking Necmettin Erbakan and his friends out.

And then later 650 delegates asked congress again, but this request was rejected by Party's General Administrative Board. Upon the decision appointment of the congress call committee by the court, 53 chairman, 65 mayors and many politician left Felicity Party on 1 October 2010.

Kurtulmuş announced a new political movement, calls Civilization Politics Movement.

People's Voice Party (2010–2012) 

235 politicians who united around Civilization Politics Movement founded the People's Voice Party (HAS Party) on 1 November 2010. And Kurtulmuş was elected as chairman of the party by 207 votes of 210 delegates at the 1st party congress held in Ankara Atatürk Sports Hall on 28 November 2010 on the 28th day of the founded of HAS Party.

Combination process 
Chairman of AKP and Prime Minister Recep Tayyip Erdoğan offered Kurtulmuş to combinate AKP with HAS Party on 12 July 2012. According to the decision taken by the authorized persons of two sides and combination process has started. HAS Party invited the delegates and dissolved itself at the extraordinary congress held on 19 September 2012 by 165 votes of the current 177 delegates according to the decision of combination.

Justice and Development Party (2012–Current) 
After the HAS Party's termination, Kurtulmuş joined AKP at a ceremony held in İstanbul on 22 September 2012 with many people.

– Kurtulmuş was elected as a Member of Main Administrative Board at 4th AKP Congress held in Ankara on 30 September 2012, was appointed as vice chairman of party on the economy politics.

– When Prime Minister Recep Tayyip Erdoğan was elected as President of Turkey at presidential elections in 2014, Ahmet Davutoğlu replaced himself as a Prime Minister and Kurtulmuş became Deputy Prime Minister at 62nd Government.

– Kurtulmuş was elected as the Ordu parliamentarian in the elections of June 2015 and became Deputy Prime Minister and Spokesperson again at the 63rd Government under Ahmet Davutoğlu's Prime Ministry.

– Kurtulmuş was elected as the Ordu parliamentarian again in the elections of November 2015, became Deputy Prime Minister and Spokesperson again at 64th Government under Ahmet Davutoğlu's Prime Ministry.

– Ahmet Davutoğlu when resigned prime ministry President Erdogan gave the government formation duty to Binali Yıldırım. Kurtulmuş served as deputy prime minister again at 65th Government under Binali Yıldırım's Prime Ministry. After a while held on 19 July 2017 he became Minister of Culture and Tourism in cabinet overhaul.

– Kurtulmuş was elected as a parliamentarian of Istanbul on 24 June 2018 and became Deputy chairman of AKP at the 6th party congress, on 18 August 2018.

References

External links
https://twitter.com/NumanKurtulmus

1959 births
Living people
People from Ünye
Turkish people of Georgian descent
Virtue Party politicians
Felicity Party politicians
People's Voice Party politicians
Turkish economists
Istanbul University alumni
Leaders of political parties in Turkey
Members of the 25th Parliament of Turkey
Members of the 63rd government of Turkey
Academic staff of Istanbul University
Members of the 26th Parliament of Turkey
Members of the 64th government of Turkey
Deputy Prime Ministers of Turkey
Ministers of Culture and Tourism of Turkey